Waltteri Merelä (born 6 July 1998) is a Finnish professional ice hockey player. He is currently playing for Tappara of the Finnish Liiga. Merelä made his Liiga debut appearance for Pelicans during the 2018–19 Liiga season. In December 2021, he made his debut in the Finland men's national ice hockey team.

References

External links
 

1998 births
Living people
Tappara players
Lahti Pelicans players
Finnish ice hockey forwards
People from Ylöjärvi
Sportspeople from Pirkanmaa